Kendriya Vidyalaya No.1 Rajnagar, Hubli is a school in Hubli, Karnataka, India, established in 1965 to provide primary and higher Secondary (10+2) education to the children of Central Government employees and also others of Hubli city. The school follows the syllabus of the Central Board of Secondary Education, New Delhi. The school is situated at the foot of the Nrupatunga Betta.

History
Kendriya Vidyalaya (also once referred to as Central School) started in a rented building in Hosur, Hubli in 1965. Late Mr. B. M. Ventakaramiah was the first principal of the school. The first batch students passed out in 1968. The school shifted to the current location at Rajnagar in 1985. The Vidyalaya has 1353 students including 833 boys and  743 girls from Class I to Class XII.

Alumni

  Dr. Bhalachandra Tembe, Professor, Department of Chemistry, IIT Powai, Mumbai. (Class of 1969).
  Dr. Sameer Madanshetti, Professor, Department of Mechanical Eng.; Kansas State University, Kansas. (Class of 1969).
  V.M.Hombali, Director, Ashok Leyland, Chennai.(Class of 1969).
  Dr.B.R.Patil, Surgical oncologist, Hubli.
  Sondur Gopal, Management Consultant, Stockholm, Sweden (Class of 1971).
  Dr. Srinivas Kulkarni, Astro-Physicist, UCLA.
  Sondur Anand, Formerly with Barclays/IDBI Bank/Banque Paribas/Deutsche Bank),Senior Banker and Treasury & Market Risk Management expert (Class of 1969)
  Bharat Kallianpurkar, Software engineer and Consultant, New Jersey, USA (Class of 1969).
  Gautam M.Sirur, Cropnosis, Edinburgh, Scotland.(Class of 1969)
  Ashok Mahalingshetty, construction engineering, Bangalore (Class of 1969).
  Mahadev Malagi, Prof. and HOD, Department of Mechanical Engg, KLE Polytechnic, Hubli.(Class of 1969).
  Jayashree Deshpande (Class of 1970), New Jersey.
  VS Sriram Sr Corporate Vice President HCL Technologies, Chennai (Class of 1973)
  Suhas S Jadhav. Divisional Controller Kolhapur Maharashtra State (Class of 1979 )
  Dr. H.Vinod Bhat, Vice Chancellor, Manipal University 
 Shripad H.Kulkarni, Formerly with TVS, Chennai (Class of 1969) 
 Vidya Borah, Principal, The Assam Valley School, Guwahati (Class of 1970)

External links
 www.no1hubli.kvs.ac.in/ Official website
 www.no1hubli.kvs.ac.in/ - Have you studied here ? Bringing back the Nostalgia,  Hubli
 https://www.youtube.com/watch?v=4Rk8gyLDog8

Kendriya Vidyalayas in Karnataka
Education in Hubli-Dharwad
Schools in Dharwad district
Educational institutions established in 1965
1965 establishments in Mysore State